The purpose of out-of-service criteria is to define a set of physical conditions under which a commercial motor vehicle ("CMV") or commercial driver may be placed out of service. The Secretary of Transportation’s statutory authority for issuing out-of-service orders is predicated upon a finding that a regulatory violation poses an imminent hazard to public safety.

49 U.S.C. § 521 (b)(5)(A). The term "imminent hazard" is defined as "any condition…likely to result in serious injury or death…" 49 U.S.C. § 521(b)(5)(B).

The out-of-service criteria should establish binding norms for use by vehicle safety inspectors and other law enforcement officials to define certain conditions that pose an imminent hazard to safety and permit the inspector to order the driver and/or his CMV out of service.

An out of service violation removes the driver and CMV off the roadway until the violation is corrected.

Traffic law